Habib Choudhury (20 July 1916 – 1 July 1968) was an Indian cricket umpire. He stood in four Test matches between 1960 and 1964.

See also
 List of Test cricket umpires

References

1916 births
1968 deaths
Place of birth missing
Indian Test cricket umpires